Zalarnaca is an Asian genus of Orthopterans, sometimes known as 'leaf-folding crickets': in the subfamily Gryllacridinae and tribe Asarcogryllacridini.  Species have been recorded from Indochina and western Malesia (including Borneo).

Species 
The Orthoptera Species File lists:
 Zalarnaca abbreviata Gorochov, 2008
 Zalarnaca aculeata Gorochov, 2005– type species, locality Gia Lai, Vietnam
 Zalarnaca kerinci Gorochov, 2008
 Zalarnaca lobata Gorochov, 2005
 Zalarnaca maninjau Ingrisch, 2018
 Zalarnaca separata (Karny, 1926)
 Zalarnaca simalurensis (Karny, 1931) (2 subspecies)
 Zalarnaca sotshivkoi Gorochov, 2008
 Zalarnaca teuthroides (Karny, 1925)
 Zalarnaca udovitshenkoi Gorochov, 2008

References

External links

Ensifera genera
Gryllacrididae
Orthoptera of Indo-China
Orthoptera of Malesia